Đerek is a Croatian surname. Notable people with the surname include:

 Ana Đerek (born 1998), Croatian artistic gymnast
 Viktor Đerek (born 2000), Croatian photographer

Croatian surnames